The 1998 Army Cadets football team was an American football team that represented the United States Military Academy as a member of Conference USA (C-USA) in the 1998 NCAA Division I-A football season. In their eighth season under head coach Bob Sutton, the Cadets compiled a 3–8 record and were outscored by their opponents by a combined total of 325 to 257.  In the annual Army–Navy Game, the Cadets defeated Navy, 34–30.

Schedule

Personnel

References

Army
Army Black Knights football seasons
Army Cadets football